Herrin High School (established 1903) is a secondary school located in Herrin, Illinois.  The high school is led by principal Jeffrey Johnson. It has an enrollment of about 735 students.  It is one of the only high schools in the U.S. that has its own bank, The First Tiger Trust.

Athletics
The school's athletic teams are known as the Tigers and compete in the Southern Illinois River-to-River Conference.  The athletic director is Andrew Anderson. Herrin High School Boys track team won IHSA Class A state track titles in 2007, 2008 and once again in 2010. The Basketball team has also enjoyed numerous successes over the years, winning the IHSA state title in 1957 over Collinsville by a score of 45 to 42, under Earl Lee. The basketball team also finished second twice losing 24 to 22 at the hands of Granite City in 1940 under Russ Emery, and 50 to 47 against Pleasant Plains in 2002 under Mike Mooneyham. The girls softball team has been very successful, finishing 2nd in state four times and winning conference several times under coach retired coach Bruce Jilek. The school's football team was coached  by Jason Karnes, until he stepped down in the fall of 2019. Karnes was  moderately successful over his career, having reached the State Playoffs all but two of the seasons he was head coach. The Tigers' sporting events are broadcast on 103.5 ESPN Radio, the voice of the Tigers is Mike Murphy.

Notable alumni

 Ray Chapman (1891–1920), second baseman for the Cleveland Indians
 Richard Clarida (born 1957), vice chairman of the Federal Reserve Board
 Steve Fisher (born 1945), coach of the Michigan Wolverines and San Diego State men's basketball teams
 Jim Ranchino (1936-1978), pollster, political consultant, and political scientist at Ouachita Baptist University

References

External links
 Herrin High School home page

Public high schools in Illinois
Schools in Williamson County, Illinois